The A4 motorway connects Kosovo with Skopje and continues southeast towards Štip, Radoviš, and Strumica, eventually reaching the border with Bulgaria near Novo Selo. The 47 km stretch from Miladinovci to Štip was completed in late 2018, while the works on the Skopje - Blace (Kosovo border) section will begin in 2020. Further south-east from Štip to Radovis, there is an express road under construction, which could potentially be upgraded to a motorway in the future.

See also
 Motorways in North Macedonia

References

Motorways in North Macedonia